Neochryopus savagei is a species of beetle in the family Carabidae, the only species in the genus Neochryopus.

References

Scaritinae